"Home Sweet Home" is a song co-written and recorded by American country music band The Farm.  It was released in October 2011 as the first single from their debut album The Farm. The song was written by band members Nick Hoffman, Damien Horne and Krista Marie with Danny Myrick.

Critical reception
Billy Dukes of Taste of Country gave the song four and a half stars out of five, saying that "There’s something new with each spin, including some delicious imagery late in the song."

Music video
The music video was directed by The Edde Brothers and premiered in February 2012.

Chart performance
"Home Sweet Home" debuted at number 54 on the U.S. Billboard Hot Country Songs chart for the week of November 5, 2011.

Year-end charts

References

2011 debut singles
2011 songs
The Farm (U.S. band) songs
Elektra Records singles
Songs written by Danny Myrick